Hellinsia tupaci is a moth of the family Pterophoridae. It is found in Ecuador.

Adults are on wing in December.

Etymology
The species is named after the Inca prince Tupac Yupanqui.

References

Moths described in 2011
tupaci
Moths of South America